James Bernard Dunn (June 27, 1927 – August 11, 2016) was an American politician in the state of South Dakota. He was a member of the South Dakota State Senate from 1973 to 2000. Throughout his state senate term, he represented the 26th and 31st districts. He was an alumnus of Black Hills State University and a veteran in the United States Army. He also sat briefly in the South Dakota House of Representatives from 1971 to 1972. Dunn died on August 11, 2016 at the age of 89.

References

1927 births
2016 deaths
People from Lead, South Dakota
Black Hills State University alumni
Republican Party members of the South Dakota House of Representatives
Republican Party South Dakota state senators